Dmytro Mykolaiovych Zayko (born 30 July 1985) is a Ukrainian football striker.

Club history
Dmytro Zayko began his football career in CYSS Mykolaiv in Mykolaiv. He signed with FC Kremin Kremenchuk during 2009 summer transfer window.

Career statistics

References

External links
  Profile – Official Kremin site
  FC Kremin Kremenchuk Squad on the PFL website
  Profile on the FFU website

1985 births
Living people
FC Kremin Kremenchuk players
Ukrainian footballers
Association football forwards
People from Pervomaisk, Mykolaiv Oblast
Sportspeople from Mykolaiv Oblast